Moi Stadium is a multi-use stadium in Kisumu, Kenya.  It used mostly for football matches and is the home stadium of Kisumu All Stars F.C. The stadium holds 5,000 people. Gor Mahia has also been playing some of their home games there due to the unavailability of Nairobi's City Stadium. 

Football venues in Kenya
Sport in Nyanza Province
Kisumu